Robert Cauchon CM (10 September 1900 – 17 December 1980) was a Liberal party member of the House of Commons of Canada.

Cauchon was born in La Malbaie, Quebec and became a stenographer. He became an alderman of Valleyfield, Quebec in 1943. The following year, he became the municipality's mayor of that municipality and remained in that role until 1947.

After an unsuccessful attempt to win the Beauharnois—Laprairie riding in the 1945 federal election, Cauchon won a Parliamentary seat in the 1949 election at Beauharnois riding. He was re-elected to a second term in 1949, then with a riding change to Beauharnois—Salaberry he was re-elected to Parliament in 1953 and 1957. In the 1958 election, Cauchon was defeated by Gérard Bruchési of the Progressive Conservative party.

Cauchon became a member of the Order of Canada in 1977, based on his contributions to community management in Canada and his work to promote industry in his home community of Valleyfield, including his role as president of the Valleyfield Port Corporation. He died aged 80.

References

External links
 

1900 births
1980 deaths
Members of the House of Commons of Canada from Quebec
Liberal Party of Canada MPs
Mayors of places in Quebec
Members of the Order of Canada
People from Salaberry-de-Valleyfield
People from Capitale-Nationale